The 2008–09 Israeli Noar Leumit League was the 13th season since its introduction in 1994. It is the top-tier football in Israel for teenagers between the ages 18–20.

Maccabi Haifa won the title, whilst Bnei Yehuda and Hapoel Be'er Sheva were relegated.

Final table

References

External links
Israel Football Association

 

Israeli Noar Premier League seasons
Noar Leumit League